This is a list of films produced by the Tollywood film industry based in Hyderabad, Telangana in 1960.

External links 
 Earliest Telugu language films at IMDb.com (303 to 331)

1960
Telugu
Telugu films